Marriage in Slovakia is allowed for both foreigners and residents and citizens of Slovakia, as well as between a Slovak citizen and a foreigner. Marriages between Slovak citizens performed abroad are usually recognized in Slovakia. In Slovakia, marriage is constitutionally restricted to opposite-sex couples since 2015.

References

External links

Slovakia
Law of Slovakia
Slovakia